Gymnomma is a genus of tachinid flies in the family Tachinidae.

Species
G. diaphnoides Curran, 1925
G. discors Gilgio-Tos, 1893
G. nitidiventris Wulp, 1888
G. novum Gilgio-Tos, 1893

External links

Tachinidae